Tomas Johansson (born May 29, 1974 in Uppsala) is a Swedish sport shooter. He competed at the 2000 Summer Olympics in the men's skeet event, in which he tied for 43rd place.

References

1974 births
Living people
Skeet shooters
Swedish male sport shooters
Shooters at the 2000 Summer Olympics
Olympic shooters of Sweden
Sportspeople from Uppsala
20th-century Swedish people
21st-century Swedish people